The Sanchez Homestead is a historic site in Elkton, Florida, United States. It is located at 7270 Old State Road 207. It was added to the National Register of Historic Places in 2001.

See also
National Register of Historic Places listings in St. Johns County, Florida

References

External links: county-specific links are broken April 2015
 St. Johns County listings at National Register of Historic Places
 St. Johns County listings at Florida's Office of Cultural and Historical Programs

Gallery

Houses on the National Register of Historic Places in Florida
National Register of Historic Places in St. Johns County, Florida
Houses in St. Johns County, Florida
Vernacular architecture in Florida